Guglielmo Pesenti (18 December 1933 – 12 July 2002) was an Italian racing cyclist.

He competed for Italy at the 1956 Summer Olympics, held in Melbourne, Australia, in the individual sprint event where he finished in second place.

References

External links

1933 births
2002 deaths
Cyclists at the 1956 Summer Olympics
Italian male cyclists
Olympic cyclists of Italy
Olympic medalists in cycling
Olympic silver medalists for Italy
Cyclists from the Province of Bergamo
Medalists at the 1956 Summer Olympics